Future Brown are a production group formed of Fatima Al Qadiri, J-Cush, Asma Maroof and Daniel Pineda (the Los Angeles based duo also known as Nguzunguzu).

In July 2013, the group posted their first single "Wanna Party" featuring Chicago based rapper/singer Tink, followed by "World's Mine" in November. The two tracks made up the band's debut release for Warp Records after the announcement of their signing to the label in September 2014. The band released their eponymous debut album on February 24 via Warp.

Discography

Studio albums
 Future Brown (2015)

EPs
 Wanna Party / World's Mine (2014)

Mixtapes
 Future Brown Mix Vol. 1 (2015)

References

External links
 
 
 

American electronic music groups
American hip hop groups
Musical groups established in 2013
Electronic music supergroups
2013 establishments in California